The Joy of Gay Sex is a sex manual for men who have sex with men by Charles Silverstein and Edmund White. The book was first published in 1977. The original print run was for 75,000 copies. The book has been translated into French, German, Italian, Swedish, and Japanese.

The 207-page book serves as a how-to guide "with chapters on blowjobs, cruising and dirty talk, a gay Kama Sutra with suggested sex positions like 'the crab' and a cultural guide with non-sexual chapters on the realities of coming out, gay politics, racism and more." It is celebrated for its sex-positive tone. In his memoir, Silverstein wrote that they wanted the book to "have a wider focus than just sex, that it should also advise the reader about life in the gay community and the majority of passages in the finished book were of a nonsexual nature."

The book was partially dedicated to the writer and activist Chris Cox. Silverstein was White's therapist when the publisher offered him the job as co-writer. White says, "The need to pay my rent exceeded my need for therapy."

Sequels
The book was followed by The New Joy of Gay Sex, published by Perennial in August 1993, co-authored by Felice Picano, and The Joy of Gay Sex, fully revised and expanded third edition, published by William Morrow in January 2006, co-authored by Picano.

See also
 The Joy of Sex

References

1977 in LGBT history
1977 non-fiction books
1970s LGBT literature
English-language books
Gay non-fiction books
Sex manuals
Works by Edmund White
LGBT literature in the United States
Collaborative non-fiction books